Hor Al Anz is a locality in Dubai, United Arab Emirates (UAE).  The locality is in Deira, East Dubai.  Hor Al Anz is bounded by routes D 82 (Abu Baker Al Siddique Road), E 11 (Al Ittihad Road), D 82 (Al Rasheed Road) and Baghdad Street (D 95) and is subdivided into Hor Al Anz and Hor Al Anz East.

With a population of 40,302 (2000), Hor Al Anz is one of the most populated residential areas in Dubai. Important landmarks in Hor Al Anz include the headoffices of the Al Ghurair group, Hor Al Anz Park, Ramada Continental Hotel, New Medical Center, Deira Post Office, and Al Mulla Plaza. The nearest Metro stations are Abu backer al sidhique and Abu hail, green line stations.

Hor Al Anz is named after Al Anz, a horse that belonged to Sheikh Saeed bin Maktoum the former ruler of Dubai.

Educational institutions in Hor Al Anz Are:
Little Flower English School
Pearl Wisdom School

References

Communities in Dubai